Usechus is a genus of ironclad beetles in the family Zopheridae. There are at least two described species in Usechus.

Species
These two species belong to the genus Usechus:
 Usechus lacerta Motschulsky, 1845
 Usechus nucleatus Casey, 1889

References

Further reading

 
 

Zopheridae
Articles created by Qbugbot